Cris Velasco is an American video game and film composer. His works include the musical scores for Overwatch, Mass Effect, Borderlands, God of War, StarCraft II: Heart of the Swarm and Bloodborne.

Biography 
He has been featured in the God of War video game series, with four tracks on the God of War, four on the God of War II, and five on the God of War III soundtracks. He also composed music for the video game based on the original Battlestar Galactica series, Terminator 3: Redemption, TMNT, Anderson's Cross, Company of Heroes 2, Haze, Splinter Cell: Double Agent (main theme only), Clive Barker's Jericho and is credited with doing additional music for Van Helsing. He is also credited to doing the game score for Hellgate: London in 2007.

Velasco collaborates with fellow composer Sascha Dikiciyan and in 2009, they both scored the soundtrack for the game Prototype, along with other projects together. He has also scored tracks for Mass Effect 2, Borderlands,  Tron: Evolution and Mass Effect 3. He has also scored tracks for Zombi U, Enemy Front, Bloodborne, and Battleborn.

Works

Video games

References

External links
 
 

American film score composers
American male film score composers
Living people
Video game composers
Place of birth missing (living people)
Year of birth missing (living people)